Mihamleh-ye Olya (also Romanized as Mīhamleh-ye ‘Olyā; also known as Mīhamleh-ye Bālā, Mihim Olya, and Miyāmleh Bala) is a village in Deymkaran Rural District, Salehabad District, Bahar County, Hamadan Province, Iran. At the 2006 census, its population was 893, in 205 families.

References 

Populated places in Bahar County